Thiazovivin is a drug which acts as a potent and selective inhibitor of the enzyme Rho kinase. It is used alongside a cocktail of other growth factors and modulators in cell culture techniques for the generation of induced pluripotent stem cells, which can then be used for a wide variety of applications.

See also 
 Rho kinase inhibitor

References 

Enzyme inhibitors
Thiazoles
Pyrimidines
Amides
Amines